Wickes is the surname of:

 Alan Wickes (born 1939), former Australian rules football player and administrator
 Craig Wickes (born 1962), New Zealand rugby player
 Eliphalet Wickes (1769–1850), American politician
 Frances G. Wickes (born 1875–1967), American psychologist
 George Wickes (1698–1761), English silversmith
 Joseph A. Wickes (1826–1915), American politician and judge
 Lambert Wickes (1735–1777), Continental Navy captain
 Mary Wickes (1910–1995), American film and television actress
 Richard Wickes (died 1776), Continental Navy officer, brother of Lambert Wickes

See also
 Wicks (surname)